We're Here with You is the second studio album by the American electronic rock band Julien-K, which was released on January 23, 2012. The album was written by members Ryan Shuck and Amir Derakh, and produced by Julien-K. A deluxe edition is available for digital download on iTunes.

Background 
Julien-K collaborated with several friends in the writing and production of the album. Collaborations included on the record for the remix EP are Z-Listers, Motor, Sharooz, DJ Hyper, Benjamin Vial, and Sam Vandal.

Promotion 
To promote the album, a song that was originally recorded for inclusion on We're Here With You but was later removed from the final track listing, "The Hunting" (mixed by Jay Baumgardner), was released for free to fans who participated in a virtual game called The Hunt.

To complete the second part of The Hunt, fans were required to get "The Hunting" scrobbled by 1,000 listeners, and 10,000 scrobbles total on Last.fm, which then unlocked another unreleased non-album track "Everyone Knows". Derakh revealed that this was the first-ever Julien-K track, and the released demo remained unchanged from its first being recorded in 2004.

Track listing

Related tracks

We're Here With You Remix EP

References 

Julien-K albums
2012 albums